Scopula malayana is a moth of the family Geometridae described by Hans Bänziger and David Stephen Fletcher in 1985. It is found in western Malaysia.

References

Moths described in 1985
malayana
Moths of Asia